George H. Walsh (November 24, 1845 – April 2, 1913) was an American newspaper editor and publisher from Grand Forks, North Dakota. He served on the council of the Dakota Territory and was instrumental in the founding of the University of North Dakota.

Walsh was one of the earliest settlers of Grand Forks. He was selected as a member of the Territorial Council, serving from 1879 until 1889. The council, in turn, elected him their president from 1879 until 1881. He also served in the North Dakota House of Representatives and as speaker during the 1893 session.

Honors
In 1881, when the territorial legislature authorized a new county north of Grand Forks, they named it Walsh County in his honor. Walsh Hall at the University of North Dakota bears his name.

Notes

1845 births
1913 deaths
Politicians from Grand Forks, North Dakota
Members of the Dakota Territorial Legislature
Members of the North Dakota House of Representatives
Speakers of the North Dakota House of Representatives
Journalists from South Dakota
Journalists from North Dakota
Journalists from Montana
Politicians from Montreal
Journalists from Montreal
19th-century American politicians